Mohammed Salam is a Sudanese  born-Qatari football player who plays for Al Kharitiyath in the Qatar Stars League.  He plays as a defender and he wears the number 14.

References

External links
 

1990 births
Sudanese footballers
Sudanese expatriate footballers
Qatari footballers
Living people
Al-Markhiya SC players
Al Kharaitiyat SC players
Qatar Stars League players
Qatari Second Division players
Association football defenders
Qatari people of Sudanese descent
Sudanese emigrants to Qatar
Naturalised citizens of Qatar
Place of birth missing (living people)